Mwadini Abbas Jecha is a Member of Parliament in the National Assembly of Tanzania.

References

Living people
Members of the National Assembly (Tanzania)
Year of birth missing (living people)
Place of birth missing (living people)